(A) New Beginning(s) may refer to:

Film and television
 Friday the 13th: A New Beginning, a 1985 film in the Friday the 13th series
 Dragonheart: A New Beginning, a 2000 sequel to the film Dragonheart
 Doctor Who at the BBC Radiophonic Workshop Volume 2: New Beginnings 1970–1980, an audio CD featuring music from TV's Doctor Who
 New Beginnings, a DVD Box set featuring three Doctor Who stories (The Keeper of Traken, Logopolis and Castrovalva)
 A New Beginning, a religious television show and radio program hosted by Greg Laurie
 "A New Beginning" (The Walking Dead), the first episode of the ninth season of the post-apocalyptic horror television series The Walking Dead
New Beginnings (2010 TV series), Singaporean drama series
New Beginnings (2015 TV series), Kenyan soap opera

Other
 New Beginnings (Dragonlance), an adventure for fantasy role-playing game
 New Beginnings High School, a secondary school in Indianapolis, Indiana
 A New Beginning (speech), Barack Obama speech at Cairo University, 2009
 A New Beginning (video game), a 2010 adventure game
 NJPW The New Beginning, a professional wrestling event
 The Royal Ranger: A New Beginning, a book by author John Flanagan
New Beginnings Press

Music

Albums
 New Beginnings (Don Pullen album) (1988)
 New Beginning (Tracy Chapman album) (1995), or the title song
 New Beginning (SWV album) (1996)
 New Beginning (Stephen Gately album) (2000)
 New Beginnings (Gerald Albright album) (2006)
 New Beginning (Band-Maid album) (2015)
 New Beginnings (Radio Moscow album) (2017)
 New Beginnings (Reason album) (2020)
 New Beginnings, an album by The Advent (1997)
 New Beginnings, an album by Tim (2010)
 A New Beginning (album), a 2007 album by the Dutch rock/melodic metal band La-Ventura

Songs
 "New Beginning" (Shannon Noll song) (2004)
 "New Beginning" (Bucks Fizz song) (1986)
 "New Beginning" (Stephen Gately song) (2000)
 "New Beginning", a single by the British group Precious from Precious (2000)
 "New Beginning", a song by Matt Brouwer from Imagerical (2001)
 "New Beginnings", a song by the American band Finch from What It Is to Burn (2002)
 "A New Beginning", a song by Good Charlotte from The Young and the Hopeless (2002)
 "A New Beginning", a song by Wolfie's Just Fine (Jon Lajoie) (2016)

See also